Ivan Vasylovych Vasyunik (born 7 July 1959) is a Ukrainian politician, who served in different posts, including vice prime minister.

Career
Vasyunik served as first deputy secretary of Presidential Administration of Ukraine until 2005. He was appointed acting presidential secretary on 6 September 2005. He replaced Oleksandr Zinchenko in the post.

In late 2007, Vasyunik was appointed vice prime minister to the cabinet led by Prime Minister Yulia Tymoshenko. At that position he was put in charge for the preparation to the Euro 2012.

References

Further reading
 Aslund, A. (2009). How Ukraine Became a Market Economy and Democracy. 
 (2010). The World Factbook..

External links

 Vice Prime Minister of Ukraine Ivan Vasyunyk participated in a session of the Coordinating Council for preparation of measures devoted to the 75th anniversary of Holodomor (Famine) of 1932-1933. Cabinet of Ukraine website

1959 births
Living people
People from Lviv Oblast
University of Lviv alumni
Vice Prime Ministers of Ukraine on humanitarian policy
Head of the Presidential Administration of Ukraine